Robert Ozie Yendes (May 22, 1898 – December 30, 1980) was an American Negro league pitcher in the 1910s.

A native of Kansas City, Kansas, Yendes played in the Negro leagues for the All Nations club in 1917. He later played minor league baseball for the Topeka Kaws in 1922. Yendes died in San Diego, California in 1980 at age 82.

References

External links
Baseball statistics and player information from Baseball-Reference Black Baseball Stats and Seamheads

1898 births
1980 deaths
All Nations players
20th-century African-American sportspeople